Colombiana is a 2011 French English-language action thriller film co-written and produced by Luc Besson and directed by Olivier Megaton. The film stars Zoe Saldaña with supporting roles by Michael Vartan, Cliff Curtis, Lennie James, Callum Blue, and Jordi Mollà. The term "Colombiana" means a woman from Colombia. The film is about Cataleya (named for a genus of orchids), a nine-year-old girl in Colombia whose family is killed by a drug lord. Fifteen years later, a grown Cataleya seeks her revenge.

While the film had a generally negative reception from critics, Saldaña's action sequences were praised and the movie earned $63.4 million against a $40 million budget.

Plot

In 1992, in Bogota, Colombia, drug baron Don Luis Sandoval sends his enforcer Marco and a gang of armed men to kill his associate Fabio Restrepo and his family because Fabio has defied him by trying to leave his criminal life behind. Fabio gives his nine-year-old daughter, Cataleya, a SmartMedia computer memory card loaded with information on Don Luis' business and tells her it's her "passport"; he also gives her the address of her uncle Emilio in Chicago, who will take care of her. Finally, he leaves her with her mother's cataleya orchid necklace. After Fabio and his wife Alicia are gunned down, Cataleya escapes and seeks asylum at the U.S. Embassy. She is granted passage to the United States after handing over the memory card to embassy staff. Although American officials attempt to transfer her into the foster care system, Cataleya tracks down her uncle in Chicago and asks him to train her as a killer.

Fifteen years later in 2007, a grown Cataleya has become an accomplished assassin. Emilio serves as her broker, providing her with contracts. With each murder she commits, she leaves her signature, the Cattleya flower, hoping to one day attract the attention of Don Luis so she can take her revenge. When Emilio finds out about Cataleya's intentions and that she has been targeting men connected to the Don, he begs her to stop to avoid endangering the lives of his own family, but she refuses and they have a falling out. While she is spending the night with her American boyfriend, Danny Delanay, he takes a photo of her sleeping and then shows it to a friend, who then decides to run a background check on Cataleya.

Meanwhile, FBI agent James Ross is working to identify the killer behind more than twenty unsolved murders, all of which have cattleya orchids left behind. He gets a pin on Cataleya's photo from the background check and orders her arrest, but Cataleya escapes and reaches out to Emilio, only to find him and his family brutally slaughtered. She then confronts Ross at his home and threatens his wife and children, forcing him to reach out to CIA agent Steve Richard, who she knows is sheltering Don Luis from the law in exchange for his cooperation with American authorities. After she makes it clear to Richard that she knows where to find his family, he gives her the Don's location.

Meanwhile, Don Luis learns that Cataleya is still alive and organizes his men to kill her, but she ambushes them first and wipes out the entire gang. She also confronts and kills Marco before Don Luis flees and swears revenge. Cataleya, having planted her specially trained attack dogs in his escape vehicle, orders them to tear the Don to pieces. Danny is last seen being interrogated by Ross, but the moment the agent steps outside, Cataleya calls him from a payphone before getting on a bus back to nowhere.

Cast

 Zoe Saldaña as Cataleya Restrepo / Valerie Phillips / Jennifer "Jen", a contract killer who witnessed her parents being murdered when she was nine years old.  Consumed by a desire for revenge, she leaves a drawing of a cataleya orchid at the scene of her killings as a calling card.
 Amandla Stenberg as Young Cataleya Restrepo 
 Jordi Mollà as Marco, Don Luis' main enforcer and the man who executed Cataleya's parents while she watched.
 Lennie James as FBI Special Agent James Ross, who is tasked with investigating Cataleya's killings.
 Michael Vartan as Danny Delanay, Cataleya's boyfriend.  An artist, he knows Cataleya as Jennifer and becomes frustrated with her secrecy.
 Cliff Curtis as Emilio Restrepo, Cataleya's uncle who raised her after her parents were killed.  He is also a professional killer and trains Cataleya while also booking her jobs.
 Beto Benites as Don Luis Sandoval, a Colombian drug lord who ordered the killing of Cataleya's family.  He was relocated to the U.S. after cutting a deal with the CIA.  
 Jesse Borrego as Fabio Restrepo, Cataleya's father and a former business partner of Don Luis who was ordered killed when he tried to quit the criminal life.  
 Cynthia Addai-Robinson as Alicia Restrepo, Cataleya's mother and Fabio's wife who is killed along with her husband.
 Angel Garnica as Pepe Restrepo
 Ofelia Medina as Mama Restrepo
 Callum Blue as CIA agent Steve Richard, Don Luis' handler who arranged the drug lord's relocation and manages his case.  
 Max Martini as Williams
 Sam Douglas as Willie Woogard
 Graham McTavish as Warren
 Charles Maquignon as Sergeant Bill Attwood
 Affif Ben Badra as Gennaro Rizzo

Production
The script for Colombiana was based on Mathilda, which was originally written by Luc Besson as a sequel to Léon: The Professional. After a disagreement with the Gaumont Film Company on how to proceed with the film, Besson and director Olivier Megaton reworked the script into a standalone film.

Filming began in August 2010 in locations including Chicago, New Orleans, Mexico, and France. The film was produced by Besson's EuropaCorp company and the script was written by Besson and Robert Mark Kamen.

David Martin-Jones, who wrote the article "Colombiana: Europa Corp and the Ambiguous Geopolitics of the Action Movie," stated that the film was likely to have been perceived by audiences to be an American Hollywood production since it "disguises its national origin to appeal to mainstream audiences"; he added that the trait of "aping the look of a Hollywood genre film, with a non-US twist" had been used in previous European films.

Reception

Critical response
On Rotten Tomatoes the film has a 28% rating based on 100 reviews, with an average rating of 4.88/10. The site's consensus is that "Zoe Saldaña has the chops but she's taken out by erratic and sloppy filmmaking." On Metacritic the film has a score of 45% based on reviews from 22 critics, indicating "mixed or average reviews".

Christy Lemire of The Associated Press reviewed Colombiana, writing that "The director of La Femme Nikita and The Fifth Element serves as co-writer and producer here, but this is very much a spin-off of his brand, a continuation of the kind of stereotype- and gravity-defying characters he's made his name on. Colombiana feels more hammy and muscular, though – but knowingly so, and that's what makes it solid, late-summer escapist fun." Betsy Sharkey of the Los Angeles Times wrote: "This B-movie blast of bloody blam blam is the latest chapter in the Luc Besson book of badly bruised lovelies who are better not crossed. What he began in 1990 with Nikita followed with Léon in '94 and '97's The Fifth Element, (the last written with Robert Mark Kamen, who co-wrote Colombiana with Besson), he refines in Colombiana." Claudia Puig of USA Today wrote: "This is a showy flower of an action film. Saldaña doesn't get much of a chance to emote, but her action skills blossom." Jordan Mintzer of The Hollywood Reporter, said that "There are guilty pleasures to be had in this frenzied B starring Zoe Saldaña, who gives an acrobatic performance that makes the overcooked material watchable."

Controversy
A nonprofit group called PorColombia criticized the film, saying that it stereotyped Colombia in a negative way. Carlos Macias, president of PorColombia, claimed that the film is proof of a "total lack of creativity" in "Hollywood". When asked about the situation in an interview, Saldaña said "Shame on them? I don't know, I wish I knew how to address stupid unintelligent comments but I don't, I'm not a stupid person." In his review in Senses of Cinema, David Martin-Jones named and analyzed a number of shortcomings. He stated that in spite of all its resemblances to Hollywood blockbusters this film provided—in comparison—at least "a different perspective" concerning immigration and international wealth inequality. Martin-Jones states that in the film, a "character from the global south wreaks havoc on the wealthy and corrupt in the global north." He states that the film "juxtaposes the spaces of wealth inequality that coexist and proliferate under globalization." In the film, Saldaña's travels "mirror[ ] the trajectory of many immigrants forced to travel to the global north due to conflict or poverty." The "film offers the possibility of considering the world from a different perspective than is usually seen in a Hollywood blockbuster."

Box office
Colombiana debuted in second place in its first week at the U.S. box office with $10,408,176 behind The Help. It stayed No. 2 until 31 August 2011, when it went down to No. 3 behind The Help and The Debt. The film has made $36,665,854 in United States and Canada, and $24,300,000 internationally, bringing its total to $60,965,854 worldwide.

Remake and sequel
A Bengali film production company Jaaz Multimedia created an unauthorised remake named Agnee. It stars Mahiya Mahi, Arefin Shuvo and Misha Sawdagor, and was released in February 2014. The film set a box office record in Bangladesh.

At the 2015 CineEurope, when the production house EuropaCorp announced upcoming films, it mentioned that Colombiana 2 was in development. While Saldaña responded to an interviewer, in 2017, that she wouldn't mind reprising her role as Cataleya, as of early 2019 there has been no further news from EuropaCorp to suggest a sequel is forthcoming.

See also
 Colombia in popular culture

References

External links
 
 
 
 Colombiana: Europa Corp and the Ambiguous Geopolitics of the Action Movie at Senses of Cinema
 

2011 films
2011 action thriller films
French action thriller films
Films about Colombian drug cartels
Films about contract killing
Films set in 1992
Films set in 2007
Films set in Chicago
Films set in Colombia
Films shot in Chicago
Films shot in New Orleans
Girls with guns films
2010s Spanish-language films
2010s vigilante films
French vigilante films
French films about revenge
Films directed by Olivier Megaton
Films produced by Luc Besson
Films scored by Nathaniel Méchaly
Films with screenplays by Luc Besson
Films with screenplays by Robert Mark Kamen
Stage 6 Films films
TriStar Pictures films
EuropaCorp films
Parkour in film
English-language French films
2010s English-language films
Spanish-language French films
2011 multilingual films
French multilingual films
2010s French films